The Consulate-General of Iran, Dubai is the consulate of Iran in Dubai, United Arab Emirates. It serves the Iranian community in Dubai. It is located on Al Wasl Road in Jumeirah, near the Iranian Hospital.

See also

 Iran–United Arab Emirates relations
 Embassy of Iran, Abu Dhabi
 List of diplomatic missions of Iran
 List of diplomatic missions in Dubai

References

External links
  
 Official website 

Iran
Dubai
Iran–United Arab Emirates relations